The Church of St Mary the Virgin is a Church of England parish church in Wellingborough, Northamptonshire. The church is a Grade I listed building.

History
The church was built from 1908 to 1930, and was designed by Sir Ninian Comper. It is in the Perpendicular Gothic style. The design and interior of the church was influenced by the Oxford Movement and the Victorian revival of ritualism Financing of the work was largely due to the Misses Sharman of Wellingborough.

On 9 June 1970, St Mary's Church was designated a Grade I listed building. It is one of only a few Grade I listed buildings built in the 20th century.

Present day

The parish of St Mary the Virgin Wellingborough is in the Archdeaconry of Northampton in the Diocese of Peterborough.

St Mary's stands in the Anglo-Catholic tradition of the Church of England. As the parish has passed resolutions to reject the ordination of women, it receives alternative episcopal oversight from the Bishop of Richborough (currently Norman Banks). It is also affiliated with Forward in Faith and The Society.

Notable clergy
 Michael Bent, later Archdeacon of Taranaki in New Zealand and Dean of Holy Trinity Cathedral, Fiji, served his curacy here from 1955 to 1960.

List of vicars

1948-1951: Fr Fisher
 1952–1966: Fr Raymond Brown
 1967–1988: Fr Thomas Finch 
 1990–1994: Fr Alan Robinson (priest in charge) (now Rector of Corpus Christi Catholic Church, Maiden Lane - the Diocesan Shrine of the Blessed Sacrament for the Diocese of Westminster)
 1996–present: Fr Robert Farmer, SSC (priest in charge, 1996–2000)

References

External links
 Parish website
 A Church Near You entry

Wellingborough
Wellingborough
Wellingborough
Wellingborough
Wellingborough
Wellingborough